Sven Henrik Lindman (born 19 April 1942) is a Swedish former footballer who played mainly for Djurgårdens IF. He played there between 1965 and 1980 and made 312 appearances in Allsvenskan which is a record for the club. During his time at the club he scored 49 goals. He was capped 21 times and scoring one goal for the Swedish national team. He was part of Sweden's 1974 FIFA World Cup squad.

Club career
Sven Lindman started his career in local Ormsjö team Ormsjö IF Uven. In 1961, he joined Lycksele IF and later became the top scorer of Swedish football Division 2. In 1965, Lindman continued to Djurgårdens IF and was a part of the 1966 Allsvenskan winning team and scored the match-winning goal in the final match against IFK Norrköping, In 1968, he moved to SK Rapid Vienna, where he stayed for one season. He ended his contract and rejoined Djurgården, and finished his career there in the 1980 season. He made 175 consecutive appearances for Djurgårdens IF between 1970 and 1977.

International career 
Lindman made his international A debut in 1967 and played 21 matches for the Sweden national football team, in which he scored one goal. He was selected in Sweden's 1974 FIFA World Cup squad, however, he didn't play in the tournament.

Management career
After his playing career, Sven Lindman took over Karlstads BK for five seasons and later Norrstrands IF for another five seasons as a manager.

Personal life
Sven Lindman is the brother of Djurgården footballer Jörgen Lindman.

Career statistics

Honours

 Djurgårdens IF 
 Allsvenskan: 1966

References

External links
 
 

1942 births
Living people
Swedish footballers
Allsvenskan players
Austrian Football Bundesliga players
Djurgårdens IF Fotboll players
SK Rapid Wien players
Sweden international footballers
1974 FIFA World Cup players
Swedish expatriate footballers
Expatriate footballers in Austria
Association football midfielders
Swedish expatriate sportspeople in Austria